Little Green Island is an island in southeastern Australia.

Little Green Island may also refer to:

Little Green Island, adjacent to Green Island, Hong Kong
Little Green Island (Alaska)
Little Green Islands, in Fortune Bay, Newfoundland, Canada, near Green Island

See also
Green Island (disambiguation)
Big Green Island